

Aboriginal stone arrangements are a form of rock art constructed by Aboriginal Australians. Notable examples have been made by many different Australian Aboriginal cultures, and in many case are thought to be associated with spiritual ceremonies.

Each stone is well-embedded into the soil, and many have "trigger-stones" to support them. The appearance of the site is very similar to that of the megalithic stone circles found throughout Britain (although the function and culture are presumably completely different). Although its association with Indigenous Australians is well-authenticated and beyond doubt, the purpose is unclear, although it may have a connection with initiation rites. It has also been suggested that the site may have been used for astronomical purposes (Morieson 2003). Other well-known examples in Victoria include the stone arrangements at Carisbrook and Lake Bolac.

Australia's largest collection of standing stones is said to be at Murujuga, also known as the Burrup Peninsula or the Dampier Archipelago, in Western Australia, which includes tall standing stones similar to the European menhirs, as well as circular stone arrangements.

A very different example is found near Yirrkala in Arnhem Land, where there are detailed images of the praus used by Macassan fisherman fishing for Trepang, several hundred years before European contact. Here the stones are small (typically  to ), sit on the surface of the ground, and can easily be moved by hand, which also implies that they can be easily damaged or altered by modern hands, so that caution is needed when interpreting such sites. Similar examples are found scattered throughout Australia, mainly in remote or inaccessible places, and it is likely that there were many more prior to European settlement of Australia.

In south-east Australia are the Bora rings, which consist of two circles of stones, one larger than the other, which were used in an initiation ceremony and rite of passage in which boys were transformed into men.

Some Aboriginal stone arrangements in south-east Australia are aligned to cardinal directions with an accuracy of a few degrees,
while the Wurdi Youang stone arrangement, which indicates the direction of solstitial sunsets, appears to have been built around the east-west direction, again with an accuracy of a few degrees. This requirement for highly accurate direction is also indicated by the practice of orienting the graves of deceased Kamilaroi men to an accuracy of a few degrees.

See also
 Indigenous Australian art
 Aboriginal Astronomy
 Archaeoastronomy

References

Further reading
 Lane, L.,  & Fullagar, R., 1980,”Previously unrecorded aboriginal stone arrangements in Victoria”, Records of the Victorian Archaeological Survey, No. 10, June 1980, 134-151. Ministry for Conservation, Victoria.
 MacKnight & Gray “Aboriginal Stone Pictures - Art In Eastern Arnhem Land”, 1969
 Morieson, J., 2003,”Solar-based Lithic Design in Victoria, Australia”, in World Archaeological Congress,Washington DC, 2003
 Morieson, J., 2006, “Ceremonial Hill”, published leaflet
 Mountford, 1927, “Aboriginal Stone Structures in South Australia”, Trans & proc. Roy. Soc. South Australia

External links
 Burrup Rock Art
 Photos of Burrup Standing Stones

Australian Aboriginal cultural history
Archaeoastronomy
Megalithic monuments
Rock art in Australia